Metaphrynella is a small genus of microhylid frogs from the southern Malay Peninsula and Borneo. They are sometimes known as the Borneo treefrogs or tree hole frogs. The common name refers to the microhabitat of these frogs: males call from tree holes and tadpoles develop in the water contained in those holes.

Description
Metaphrynella are small, arboreal frogs that have plump bodies and adhesive finger and toe tips.

Taxonomy
Metaphrynella may be paraphyletic, as molecular data suggest that Phrynella is phylogenetically imbedded within it. Another study suggests that its closest relatives are Kaloula, Uperodon, and Ramanella. A molecular phylogenetic study by De Sá et al. (2012) shows Kaloula to be a sister clade of Metaphrynella.

Species 
There are two species:

References

 
Microhylidae
Amphibians of Asia
Amphibian genera
Taxa named by Hampton Wildman Parker